General elections were held in the Netherlands Antilles on 21 December 1950. These snap elections were necessary because in the 'Interimregeling' the number of seats and the divisions of the seats in the Estates of the Netherlands Antilles was changed.

The 22 seats in the Estates of the Netherlands Antilles consisted of twelve for Curaçao, eight for Aruba, one for Bonaire and one for the SSS Islands. At the previous elections (1949) the 21 seats consisted of eight for Curaçao, eight for Aruba, two for Bonaire and one for each of the three SSS Islands.

Results

Curaçao
Population: 98,161 (31 December 1949)
Entitled to vote: 39,768
Valid votes: 32,423
Seats: 12
Average valid votes per seat: 2,702

Aruba
Population: 53,574 (31 December 1949)
Entitled to vote: 14,521
Valid votes: 12,060
Seats: 8
Average valid votes per seat: 1,507.5

Bonaire
Population: 5,011 (31 December 1949)
Entitled to vote: 2,262
Valid votes: 1,968
Seats: 1

SSS Islands
Population: 3,578 (31 December 1949: Sint Maarten 1,513; Saba 1,110 & Eustatius 955)
Entitled to vote: 1,389 (Sint Maarten 558; Saba 469 & Sint Eustatius 362)
Valid votes: 1,005
Seats: 1

Aftermath 
The new session of the Estates started on 21  February 1951 and a month later Isa became a temporary replacement for Braam.

Around April 1951 Da Costa Gomez and Sprockel gave up their position in the parliament to join the 'Regeringsraad' (early stage of the Council of Ministers). They were succeeded by Bartels Daal and Morkos.

Mid 1951 Tromp was succeeded by Amelink and Braam returned in the parliament after Kroon left. Later that year Morkos was replaced by Smit, Goslinga by Broos and Geerman by De la Fuente.

In 1952 Amelink was succeeded by Dirksz, Gerharts by Abraham and Goslinga returned to replace Broos. After Debrot temporarily left the parliament Morkos became a member of the Estates and later that year Smit gave up his seat so Debrot could return.

In 1953 Chumaceiro replaced Van der Hoeven for a few months.

References 
 Amigoe di Curaçao, 31 October 1950
 Amigoe di Curaçao, 22 December 1950
 Amigoe di Curaçao, 23 December 1950

Elections in the Netherlands Antilles
Netherlands Antilles